Karagöl Nature Park a nature park in Turkey

Its distance to İzmir centrum is .The road although quite bended, offers splendid view of the gulf of İzmir.

It surrounds a small crater lake named "Karagöl".

References

Nature parks in Turkey
Lakes of Turkey
Menemen District
Tourist attractions in İzmir Province